Gary S. Peter Williams (born 8 March 1954) is an English former professional footballer who played in the Football League, as a defender for Preston North End, Brighton and Crystal Palace.

Career
Williams began his youth career at Marine and in 1971, signed for Preston North End. He made 112 League appearances for Preston, scoring twice, before signing for Brighton in 1977, for whom he made 158 League appearances scoring eight times. Williams is remembered for an 86th-minute winner and goal of the season contender for the club against Champions Nottingham Forest at the Goldstone on 29 March 1980.

In July 1982, Williams signed for Crystal Palace and made his debut in the first match of the 1982–83 season in a home 1–1 draw against Barnsley. He went on to make 10 consecutive appearances plus a further 3 in the League Cup before sustaining an injury which ultimately ended his professional career in 1983.

Williams then returned to Brighton for a further season in the Sussex County League with Whitehawk, representing Sussex and being part of the Hawks Championship winning team in 1984.

References

External links
Williams at holmesdale.net

1954 births
Living people
Association football defenders
English footballers
English Football League players
Marine F.C. players
Preston North End F.C. players
Brighton & Hove Albion F.C. players
Crystal Palace F.C. players
Whitehawk F.C. players